The passage of Hurricane Isaac generated a long-lived, nine-day tornado outbreak that affected the Central and Eastern United States from August 27 to September 4, 2012. The hurricane produced a total of 34 tornadoes, with the strongest being two EF2 tornadoes in Mississippi and Arkansas. There were 19 tornado watches were issued for Isaac over eight days and 171 tornado warnings were issued across 12 states, with 77 of them in Mississippi.

Event summary
A tropical wave emerged off the western coast of Africa into the Atlantic Ocean on August 16. Twelve hours later, the depression intensified into Tropical Storm Isaac. After moving through the Straits of Florida and into the eastern Gulf of Mexico, the system initially struggled to organize as its wind field expanded. By 12:00 UTC on August 28, however, data from an aircraft reconnaissance flight supported designating Isaac as a Category 1 hurricane. The cyclone attained peak winds of  prior to making two landfalls, one at the Southwest Pass over the Mississippi River and the second near Port Fourchon, Louisiana. Once inland, Isaac steadily weakened and dissipated over Missouri early on September 1.

On August 22, the Storm Prediction Center noted the potential for severe weather to evolve in association with Isaac; however, considerable model uncertainty precluded the addition of a threat area. Three days later, a severe threat area was outlined across southern Georgia, southeastern Alabama, and northern Florida as the outer bands of the hurricane were forecast to rotate into the region.

Confirmed tornadoes

August 27 event

August 29 event

August 30 event

August 31 event

September 1 event

September 3 event

September 4 event

See also

List of North American tornadoes and tornado outbreaks

Footnotes

References

External links

 Hurricane Isaac Advisory Archive
 Hurricane Isaac Advisory Graphics Archive

Tornda
Tornadoes of 2012
Tornadoes in Florida
Tornadoes in Alabama
Tornadoes in Illinois
Tornadoes in Delaware
Tornadoes in New Jersey
2012 natural disasters in the United States
August 2012 events in the United States
September 2012 events in the United States
F2 tornadoes